Gladstone High School is a public high school in Gladstone, Oregon, United States.

Construction renovations
A bond was passed for the Gladstone School District in the November 2006 general election. The cost of the construction at GHS is estimated at $26,901,487.29 The money has been used to expand the cafeteria, fix leaks, build a new science and technology center, and complete various other projects.

Academics

In 1987, Gladstone High School was honored in the Blue Ribbon Schools Program, the highest honor a school can receive in the United States.

In 2008, 93% of the school's seniors received their high school diploma. Of 180 students, 168 graduated, 6 dropped out, 5 received a modified diploma, and 1 is still in high school.

On November 17, 2009, science teacher Kevin Zerzan was awarded a Milken Family Foundation National Educator Award, along with $25,000.

Alumni
Matt Lindland, former Olympic wrestler and Mixed Martial Artist

References

External links 
 Gladstone High School website

Gladstone, Oregon
High schools in Clackamas County, Oregon
Educational institutions established in 1966
Public high schools in Oregon
1966 establishments in Oregon